The Medal of Petar Mrkonjić is a Medal of Republika Srpska. It was established in 1993 by the Constitution of Republika Srpska and 'Law on orders and awards' valid since 28 April 1993.

The Medal is awarded to members of the Army of Republika Srpska who achieved significant feats in battle.

It is named after Petar Mrkonjić alter ego of King Peter I of Serbia, name that he used in Great Eastern Crisis before he become king.

See also 
 Petar Mrkonjić
 Orders, decorations and medals of Republika Srpska

References

Orders, decorations, and medals of Republic of Srpska
Awards established in 1993